Pan Chung is a walled village in Tai Po District, Hong Kong.

Administration
Pan Chung and neighboring Pan Chung San Tsuen are recognized villages under the New Territories Small House Policy. It is one of the villages represented within the Tai Po Rural Committee. For electoral purposes, Pan Chung is part of the San Fu constituency, which was formerly represented by Max Wu Yiu-cheong until May 2021.

See also
 Walled villages of Hong Kong
 Ha Keng Hau
 Ma Wo

References

External links

 Delineation of area of existing village Pan Chung (Tai Po) for election of resident representative (2019 to 2022)
 Delineation of area of existing village Pan Chung San Tsuen (Tai Po) for election of resident representative (2019 to 2022)
 Antiquities Advisory Board. Historic Building Appraisal. Shrine, Pan Chung, Tai Po Pictures
 Antiquities Advisory Board. Historic Building Appraisal. Mak Ancestral Hall, No. 16 Pan Chung, Tai Po Pictures

Walled villages of Hong Kong
Villages in Tai Po District, Hong Kong
Tai Po